Poison is a substance that causes injury, illness, or death.

Poison or The Poison may also refer to:

Fictional characters
 Poison (comics), a Marvel Comics heroine with toxic, poisonous abilities
 Doctor Poison, two DC Comics villains
 Poison (Final Fight), a character in the Final Fight and Street Fighter video-game series

Film and television
 Poison (film), a 1991 film directed by Todd Haynes
 Poisons or the World History of Poisoning, a 2001 Russian film directed by Karen Shakhnazarov
 "Poison" (House), a 2005 episode of House
 "Poison" (Law & Order: Criminal Intent), an episode of Law & Order: Criminal Intent

Literature
 "Poison" (story), by Roald Dahl
 Poison (Kielland novel), by Alexander Kielland
 Poison (Wooding novel), by Chris Wooding

Music

Bands 
 Poison (band), an American glam metal band

Albums and EPs 

 Poison (Chamillionaire album), unreleased
 Poison (Rebecca album), 1987
 Poison (Bell Biv DeVoe album), 1990
 Poison (Groove Coverage EP), 2004
 The Poison, an album by Bullet for My Valentine, 2005
 Poison (Secret EP), 2012
 Poison (Swizz Beatz album), 2018

Songs 
 "Poison" (Kool G Rap & DJ Polo song), 1988
 "Poison" (Alice Cooper song), 1989
 "Poison" (Bell Biv DeVoe song), 1990
 "Poison" (The Prodigy song), 1995
 "Poison" (Bardot song), 2000
 "Poison" (Beyoncé song), 2008
 "Poison" (Nicole Scherzinger song), 2010
 "Poison" (Secret song), 2012
 "Poison" (Rita Ora song), 2015
 "Poison" (Martin Garrix song), 2015
 "Poison" (Aaliyah song), 2021
 "Poison", a song by Kira Kosarin
 "Poison", by Motörhead from Bomber, 1979
 "Poison", by Kool G. Rap & DJ Polo (1989) from Road to the Riches (song sampled in the chorus of "Poison" by Bell Biv Devoe)
 "Poison", by Lisa Stansfield from her debut album Affection, 1989
 "Poison", by Uhm Jung-hwa from Invitation, 1998
 "Poison", by Takashi Sorimachi from the live-action drama Great Teacher Onizuka, 1998
 "Poison", by Hot Water Music from The New What Next, 2004
 "The Poison", by Pedro the Lion from Achilles Heel, 2004
 "The Poison", by Alkaline Trio from Crimson, 2005
 "Poison", by Elise Estrada from Elise Estrada, 2008
 "Poison", by Martina Topley-Bird from The Blue God, 2008
 "Poison", by All Time Low from Nothing Personal, 2009
 "The Poison", by The All-American Rejects from Almost Alice: Music Inspired by the Motion Picture, 2010
 "Poison", by Namie Amuro from Feel, 2013
 "Poison", by Waxahatchee from Ivy Tripp, 2015
 "Poison", by Brent Faiyaz from A.M. Paradox, 2016
 "Poison", by Loïc Nottet for his debut studio album Selfocracy, 2017

Other 
 The Poison: Live at Brixton, a DVD by Bullet For My Valentine

Other uses
 Nuclear poison, a neutron-absorbent material that impedes an intended nuclear reaction
 Poison (perfume), by Christian Dior
 Poison (game), a children's game
 In software engineering, a poison is a special value given to uninitialized or freed memory; reading this memory provides only dummy data (however identifiable) or may cause the software to voluntarily be trapped (e.g. pointer to nowhere). This is employed as a security mechanism against attacks and a way to detect software failures.

See also
 Poisson (disambiguation)